Bernie Dowling (born 6 June 1942) is a former Australian rules footballer who played for the Footscray Football Club in the Victorian Football League (VFL).

Notes

External links 
		

Living people
1942 births
Australian rules footballers from Victoria (Australia)
Western Bulldogs players
Maryborough Football Club players